Kristineberg is a City District in Oskarshamn, Kalmar County, Sweden. The population is 3,048 in 2013.

The first apartment house in Kristineberg was building in December 1966 and the last house was completed in 1979. Kristineberg consists of three areas, Lyckan, Karlsborg and Marieborg. Today it lives 3048 people in Kristineberg.

School, libraries, supermarket, veterinary, church and pizzeria is located in Kristineberg center.

References

See also
Oskarshamn
Oskarshamn Municipality

Populated places in Kalmar County